Akishio (SS-579) is a retired Japanese diesel-electric . She was laid down in 1983, launched in 1985, commissioned in 1986, and served until 2004. She served as part of both the 1st and 5th Submarine Squadrons of the 1st Submarine Flotilla. She took part in numerous drills, including the Pacific Reach 2000 drills. She is now on display outside Kure Maritime Museum.

Design and construction
She had a teardrop hull, and was powered by two Kawasaki-MAN V8V24/30AMTL diesel engines, which produced , a Fuji electric motor, which produced , and was propelled by one shaft, with a five-bladed propeller. She used her diesel engines while surfaced, and her electric motor when submerged. She had a top speed of  while surfaced, and  while submerged. She was armed with six  torpedo tubes, and had a complement of 75: 10 officers and 65 enlisted men. She used a Hughes/Oki ZQQ 5 hull mounted sonar, and a ZQR 1 towed array sonar.

Service history
Akishio was laid down in Kobe by Mitsubishi Heavy Industries on 15 April 1983, launched on 22 January 1985, and commissioned on 5 March 1986. Upon being commissioned, on 5 March 1986, Akishio was immediately assigned to the 1st Submarine Squadron of the 1st Submarine Flotilla of the Japan Maritime Self-Defense Force. On 8 June 1990, she was reassigned to the 5th Submarine Squadron, which was also part of the 1st Submarine Flotilla. Her crew was trained by American submariners, from September to October, in 1991.

Akishio took part in the Pacific Reach 2000 drills, which took place from 2 to 14 October 2000, off of Singapore. The navies of the United States, Japan, Singapore, and South Korea took part. Because of the Kursk submarine disaster which had happened earlier that year, the Pacific Reach 2000 drills involved submarine rescue exercises, which Akishio performed in. This was the first time Japanese ships had taken part in a multilateral submarine rescue drill, although they had taken part in similar exercises bilaterally, with the US Navy. Japan's constitution places limits on their ability to perform collective-defence drills. Because of this, Japan joined the drills from a humanitarian standpoint, rather than a military one.

She was decommissioned on 3 March 2004. After being decommissioned, Akishio was moved from the water, and placed on display outside the Kure Maritime Museum on 5 April 2007. After being placed there, she became known as "Tetu-no-Kujira Kan", or "Iron Whale Museum". The museum has been criticized by many as being too militaristic. One of Japan's national newspapers, Asahi Shimbun, said that the museum focused too much upon military ships and weapons.

References

Citations

Books

Websites

1985 ships
Museums established in 2007
Yūshio-class submarines
Museum ships in Japan
Museums in Hiroshima Prefecture
Ships built by Mitsubishi Heavy Industries